Multiple toll-collecting controlled-access highway systems are operated in Thailand, currently serving the Greater Bangkok area and nearby provinces. The first expressway in Thailand is Chaloem Maha Nakhon Expressway, opened in 1981. Burapha Withi Expressway was the world's longest bridge from its opening in 2000 to 2010.

Thailand's different controlled-access highway systems are: the expressways operated by the Expressway Authority of Thailand, the motorways (thang luang phiset) operated by the Department of Highways, and Don Muang Tollway, a concession highway owned by the Department of Highways and operated by Don Muang Tollway PCL.

List